Ramza and Arno's was a successful traveling minstrel show active during the late 19th century and early 20th century. Ramza and Arno were considered one of the top stars in the traveling vaudeville acts  and were referred to as "comical comedians", "knockabout comedians", acrobats  and, "versatile and comic artistes". The duo often traveled with other successful and famous performers of the time. Their acts notably included trapeze stunts, pantomime sketches, as well as various other types of live performance.

Prominent minstrel manager John W. Vogel piloted many successful minstrel companies, including McNish, Ramza, and Arno's Refined Minstrels where Ramza and Arno worked with Frank McNish (Francis Edward McNish).

According to a November 19, 1888 New York Times article, the McNish, Ramza and Arno Minstrels were "having a hard time of it on the road" and it was believed they would soon disband citing Lew Benedict of Duprez & Benedict's Minstrels decision to sever his connection with the act "because he could not collect $400 back salary." Despite issues such as these, the act went on to perform into the 20th century.

References

Blackface minstrel shows and films